Herman Charles Hehl (December 10, 1899 – July 4, 1961) was a pitcher in Major League Baseball. He pitched in one game for the Brooklyn Robins during the 1918 baseball season, working one scoreless inning on June 20, 1918.

External links

1899 births
1961 deaths
Baseball players from New York (state)
Major League Baseball pitchers
Brooklyn Robins players
Jersey City Skeeters players
New Haven Weissmen players
New Haven Indians players
Columbia Comers players
Rocky Mount Tar Heels players
Rocky Mount Broncos players
Jacksonville Tars players